Philip Matthews or Philip Mathews may refer to:

 Sir Philip Matthews, 1st Baronet (c. 1642–1685), Fellow of the Royal Society of London
 Philip Mathews (archdeacon) (fl. 1689–1740), Archdeacon of Connor in Ireland
 Phil Mathews (basketball) (born 1950), American basketball coach
 Phillip Matthews (born 1960), Ireland rugby union player

See also
 Philip Bushill-Matthews (born 1943), former British politician